The 1905–06 Federal Amateur Hockey League (FAHL) season lasted from December 27, 1905, until February 28, 1906. Teams were to play an eight-game schedule, but due to the failure of the Montagnards, some teams played only 6 or 7 games.

Regular season 
With the loss of their top two teams, Ottawa and Wanderers, the quality of the FAHL declined. The teams were replaced with the Ottawa Victorias and Smiths Falls Seniors clubs.

Highlights 
The Montagnards would be completely overwhelmed 26–0 by Brockville in their final game on February 2.

Otherwise, the season was low scoring, with the notable outstanding debut of goaltender Percy LeSueur of Smiths Falls.

Final standing

Results 

† Postponed due to bad ice.

‡ No result.

* Makeup for January 25 game.

Goaltending averages

Scoring Leaders

Playoffs 
After the season ended, Smiths Falls challenged the Ottawa Senators for the Stanley Cup. Ottawa would win the series 2–0. After the series, Ottawa would hire Percy LeSueur of the Smiths Falls team.

Smiths Falls vs. Ottawa

See also 
 Federal Amateur Hockey League
 List of Stanley Cup champions
 List of pre-NHL seasons
 List of ice hockey leagues

References 

 

Federal Amateur Hockey League seasons
FAHL